2018 in philosophy

Events
Gualtiero Piccinini is awarded the 2018 Barwise Prize.
Martha Nussbaum is awarded the Berggruen Prize for her work which "shows how philosophy, far from being merely an armchair discipline, offers a greater understanding of who we are, our place in the world, and a way to live a well-lived life."
Lisa Shapiro is awarded the Elisabeth of Bohemia Prize.
Sally Haslanger and John Heil are awarded Guggenheim Fellowships in philosophy.
Ann Pettifor is presented a Hannah Arendt Award.
Michael Stolleis receives a Hegel Prize.
Nancy Cartwright receives the Hempel Award.
Sabina Leonelli is awarded the Lakatos Award.
Gillian Barker receives the PSA Women's Caucus Prize in Feminist Philosophy of Science.
Saharon Shelah is awarded the 2018 Rolf Schock Prize in Logic and Philosophy.
Margarethe von Trotta is awarded the Theodor W. Adorno Award.

Publications
Publications:
February 8 - Michel Foucault, Histoire de la sexualité, IV : Les aveux de la chair (Gallimard)
February 19 – Tommie Shelby & Brandon Terry (ed.), To Shape a New World: Essays on the Political Philosophy of Martin Luther King, Jr. (Harvard University Press)
March 4 – T. M. Scanlon, Why Does Inequality Matter? (Oxford University Press)
May 22 - Errol Morris, The Ashtray (Or the Man Who Denied Reality)
July 17 - Eugene Thacker, Infinite Resignation: On Pessimism (Repeater)

Deaths
July 5 - Claude Lanzmann, French philosopher and documentary filmmaker (b. 1925)
October 10 - Mary Midgley, British moral philosopher (b. 1919)
October 13 - Fabien Eboussi Boulaga, Cameroonian philosopher (b. 1934)
October 27 - Denis Miéville, Swiss mathematician and expert on the logic of Stanislaw Lesniewski and natural logic (b. 1946)
November 2 - Herbert Fingarette, American philosopher (b. 1921)
November 4 – Bertil Mårtensson, Swedish academic philosopher and writer of crime, fantasy and science fiction (b. 1945)
November 15 – Adolf Grünbaum, German-American philosopher of science and a critic of psychoanalysis, as well as Karl Popper's philosophy of science (b. 1923)
December 23 – Sophie Oluwole, Nigerian philosopher (b. 1936)
December 25 – Isaac Levi, John Dewey Professor of Philosophy Emeritus at Columbia University (b. 1930)

References

Philosophy
Philosophy
Philosophy by year
21st-century philosophy